A gopnik is a member of a delinquent subculture in Russia, Ukraine, Belarus, and in other former Soviet republics—a young man (or a woman, a gopnitsa) of working-class background who usually lives in suburban areas and comes from a family of poor education and income. 

The collective noun is gopota. The subculture of gopota has its roots in working-class communities in the late Russian Empire and gradually emerged underground during the later half of the 20th century in many cities in the Soviet Union. It was in the late 1980s and throughout the 1990s, during the collapse of the Soviet Union and its associated rise in poverty that saw the gopota subculture truly come to fruition and flourish. 

These years—between the late 1980s and roughly 2001—were the time when the gopota subculture was at its greatest extent, though it remained prevalent, albeit in decline, throughout much of the former Soviet space into the 2000s. As of the late 2010s, the subculture has faded for the most part, although youth gangs (such as the A.U.E.) that resemble gopota still exist in Russia and in other Slavic and Baltic countries.

Etymology
Gopnik could be related to GOP, the acronym for the Gorodskoye Obshezhitie Proletariata. These were almshouses for the destitute created by the Bolshevik government after the October Revolution in 1917. According to the Russian Dahl's Explanatory Dictionary, first published in the 19th century, an old slang word for "sleeping on streets" was "гопать" (gopat', literally "to gop") something that was related to the "mazuricks" or the criminals of Saint Petersburg.

One of the first appearances of "gopnik" in written text is in Zoopark's 1984 song Gopniki.

Stereotypical appearance and behaviour
Gopniks are often seen wearing Adidas or Puma tracksuits, which were popularized by the 1980 Moscow Olympics Soviet team. Sunflower seeds (colloquially  [семки] or  [семечки]) are habitually eaten by gopniks, especially in Ukraine and Russia.

The subculture is stereotypically associated with Russian chanson music, specifically the blatnaya pesnya subgenre. Since the mid-2010s, gopniks have been associated with hardbass music in internet memes and viral videos.

Some gopniks have Russian nationalism or Pan-Slavism as their primary political views, though there are also leftist, far-right and even neo-Nazi gopnik communities. In Russia, some gopniks hold strong anti-Western views and support the Putin administration.

Gopniks are often seen squatting in groups "in court" (на кортах, na kortakh) or "doing the crab" (на крабе, na krabe) outside blocks of flats or schools with their heels on the ground. It is described as a learned behavior, attributed to Russian and Soviet prison culture to avoid sitting on the cold ground. They are also stereotyped as being prone to substance and alcohol abuse, crime and hooliganism.

See also
Similar subcultures by country include:
 Bogan and eshay (Australia/New Zealand)
 Chav (United Kingdom)
 Dresiarz (Poland)
 Hamalli (Malta)
 Preman (Indonesia)
 Raskol (Papua New Guinea)
 Rednecks and white trash (United States)
 Flaite (Chile)
 Mat rempit (Malaysia)
 Skeet (Newfoundland, Canada)
 Ah Beng (Singapore)
 Raggare (Sweden)

References

External links 
 

Class-related slurs
Criminal subcultures
Russian culture
Social class in Russia
Soviet culture
Stereotypes of suburban people
Stereotypes of the working class
Working class in Europe
Socioeconomic stereotypes